Frederick Bates may refer to:
Frederick Bates (politician) (1777–1825), American politician
Frederick Bates (cricketer) (1899–1969), English cricketer
Frederick Bates (entomologist) (1829–1903), English entomologist